Per Michael Brundin (born 5 October 1965) is a Swedish former footballer who played as a centre back.

Between 1994 and 1996, Brundin moved abroad to play in Portugal for Vitória de Setúbal and Campomaiorense.

Honours
GIF Sundsvall
 Swedish Football Division 1 Norra: 1990

AIK
 Allsvenskan: 1998
 Svenska Cupen: 1996–97, 1998–99

References

External links
 

1965 births
Living people
Swedish footballers
Swedish expatriate footballers
Association football defenders
Allsvenskan players
Ettan Fotboll players
GIF Sundsvall players
Primeira Liga players
Vitória F.C. players
S.C. Campomaiorense players
AIK Fotboll players
Expatriate footballers in Portugal

Swedish expatriate sportspeople in Portugal